The Bassari are an ethnic group who live in Senegal, Gambia, Guinea and Guinea-Bissau. They are a matrilineal society stratified into different co ed social groups by age. The Bassari speak a Tenda language, o-niyan. They refer to themselves as a-liyan, pl. bi-liyan. They have close relations with the Fula people centered locally in the nearby hills of the Fouta Djallon. The Bassari are subsistence farmers for the most part, growing rice, millet, earth-peas and fonio.

Culture and Society

Population and Migration 
The total population is between 10,000 and 30,000. Most of the Bassari are concentrated on either side of the Senegal-Guinea border southwest of Kedougou, Kédougou Region. This areas is referred to in French as Pays Bassari, or liyan in the Bassari language.[citation needed They migrate to the cities and towns of Senegal and Guinea in the dry season in search of wage-labor, using the money they earn to buy household equipment, clothing and other necessary items.

Religious Belief 
Most of the group are animists, with a significant minority of Christians (both Catholic and Protestant). Very few Bassari are Muslims.

The mythology of the Bassari is centered on the creation god Unumbotte.

Art 
The Bassari have a long standing tradition of metallurgy which have been included in European records since the late 19th century. Importing materials through trade with the Coniagui for iron ore and Fula for copper, the Bassari process these metals within their own line of blacksmiths to craft tools and jewlry.

References

Gessain, Monique 1967, Les Migrations des Coniagui et Bassari, Paris, Mémoires de la Société des Africanistes.
Nolan, Riall 1986, Bassari Migrations: The Quiet Revolution, Boulder, Westview Press.

Ethnic groups in Senegal
Ethnic groups in the Gambia
Ethnic groups in Guinea
Ethnic groups in Guinea-Bissau